Kustaa Adolf Simonpoika Rovio (23 January 1887 in Saint Petersburg – 21 April 1938) also known as Gustav Ravelin, was a Finnish Communist politician who fled to the Russian SFSR after the Finnish Civil War. Rovio was executed during the Great Purge.

Considerable material on the activity and eventual destruction of Rovio may be found in "The Bells of the Kremlin" (University Press of New England, 1983) by Arvo Tuominen, a member of the Presidium of the Comintern, and a miraculous survivor of the purges, who escaped by becoming a representative of the Comintern in Sweden in 1938, then refused a summons to return to Moscow in 1939.

External links 
 Letter from Lenin to Rovio

1887 births
1938 deaths
Politicians from Saint Petersburg
People from Sankt-Peterburgsky Uyezd
Old Bolsheviks
Social Democratic Party of Finland politicians
Communist Party of Finland politicians
People of the Finnish Civil War (Red side)
Finnish emigrants to the Soviet Union
Great Purge victims from Finland
Finnish people executed by the Soviet Union
Residents of the Benois House
Executed communists